The Ush-Urekchen, or Ushurakchan, is a mountain range in the Chukotka Autonomous Okrug and Kamchatka Krai, Far Eastern Federal District, Russia. 

The range is composed of granite and gabbro intrusions, breaking through Devonian, Permian, Triassic and Jurassic sediments. There is extensive effusive rock cover in certain places.

History
The Ush-Urekchen was first mapped in the summer of 1870 by topographer P. Afonasiev who was part of the 1868 - 1870 East Siberia expedition of Baron Gerhard von Maydell (1835–1894) and astronomer Karl Karlovich Neyman (1830s–1887). About 60 years later, at the time of the USSR, the range was surveyed in more detail in 1928 by hydrographer Ivan Molodykh (1897 - 1939) and in 1932-33 during aerial surveys carried out by geologist Sergei Obruchev (1891 - 1965).

Geography
The Ush-Urekchen rises in the northernmost sector of the Kolyma Highlands System. The Omolon River limits the range to the southwest and makes a bend northwards at the western limit of the range. The Oloy river, a right tributary of the Omolon, limits the range to the north. The eastern end of the range is in Kamchatka Krai. 

Many short rivers originate in the range, including tributaries of the Omolon such as the Karbaschan, of the Oloy, as well as rivers of the Penzhina basin in the southeastern area of range.

Flora 
The only vegetation cover at higher altitude is mountain tundra.

See also
List of mountains and hills of Russia

References

External links
Mapio.net -  View of the Ush-Urekchen
A wooded river valley cuts through the Ush Urekchen Mountains in Chukotka. Siberia. Russia. 1994
Kolyma - Tourism
Mountain ranges of Chukotka Autonomous Okrug
Kolyma Mountains